Hjelme is a former municipality in the old Hordaland county in Norway.  The  municipality was located within the northern part of the present-day municipality of Øygarden. It existed from 1910 until 1964. The administrative centre was located at Hjelme, where the Old Hjelme Church was located.  The municipality included the main islands of Alvøyna, Seløyna, Lyngøyna, and Hernar as well as many smaller surrounding islands.  The Fedjeosen strait was the northern boundary, the Hjeltefjorden was the eastern boundary, the small Nordra Straumøysundet strait was the southern boundary, and the North Sea was to the west.

History
On 1 January 1910, the western district of the municipality of Manger (population: 986) was separated to form its own municipality called Hjelmen. On 5 November 1912 the name was changed from Hjelmen to Hjelme by royal resolution. During the 1960s, there were many municipal mergers across Norway due to the work of the Schei Committee. On 1 January 1964, the municipality of Hjelme (population: 956) was merged with the majority of the neighboring municipality of Herdla to form the new municipality named "Øygarden".

Municipal council
The municipal council  of Hjelme was made up of 13 representatives that were elected to four year terms.  The party breakdown of the final municipal council was as follows:

Churches

The Old Hjelme Church (Hjelme gamle kirke) dates from 1875. Before the church was built, the inhabitants of the parish of Hjelme had to row across the Hjeltefjorden to either Hordabø Church or Manger Church. It is built of wood and has 180 seats. The church is no longer in active use since the new Hjelme Church (Hjelme kirke) was built in 1971. It was built of concrete and has 340 seats.

See also
List of former municipalities of Norway

References

Øygarden
Former municipalities of Norway
1910 establishments in Norway
1964 disestablishments in Norway